Sarja is a Marathi film, directed by Rajdutt. It is based on a novel Shelar Khind by Marathi writer Babasaheb Purandare. It is a story of a young brave man and his wife, who assist Maratha Shivaji and his forces in capturing a fort from a Mughal Sardar.

Sarja has drawn many accolades. The film won the National Film Award for Best Feature Film in Marathi for the year 1987, for its patriotic vigour in the retelling of a story set during the turbulent times of Shivaji.

Plot
The Mughal emperor Aurangzeb orders his forces to march south towards the Maratha kingdom. Shivaji agrees for a truce with the Mughals. As a part of the treaty, Shivaji handovers many forts to Mughals. In a vicinity of one such fort, live a Dombari widow Gauri Dombarin (Seema Deo) and her daughter Kastura, who earn their livelihood by performing various acrobatic street stunts. A newly appointed Mughal Sardar (Kuldeep Pawar) of the fort is attracted to Kasturi and he tries to win her over with the help of local leader Rustom (Nilu Phule). However, both Kastura and her mother flee to Shivaji's, where they take refuge in a house of a distant relative. It is revealed that as a child, Kastura was married to Sarja (Ajinkya Deo) a son of the distant relative. A romantic relationship blossoms between Kastura and Sarja, and they consummate their childhood marriage. However, the aid of the Mughal Sardar, Rustom finds the new hideout of Kastura, and tries to kidnap her. Sarja rescues her only with timely help of brave men from the village. This incidence, however deeply disturbs the Sarja and as a result he tries to join Shivaji's army, but is ridiculed by the villagers due to his inability to protect his own wife. In mean time, to test fortification of his newly commenced fort capital Raigad, Shivaji announces an award for any one who could climb the fort without using its gates. Sarja sees this as a golden opportunity  to meet Shivaji and join his army. Sarja with a help of Kastura  climbs up the most treacherous inclines to reach the top of the fort and is awarded by Shivaji. To strengthen his forts in south, the Aurangzeb sends a few long range cannons to the captured forts in South. Shivaji see this as a major threat to his kingdom and orders his chief-of-spy Bahirji Naik (Ramesh Deo) to stop cannons from reaching the fort. Bahirji Naik with the help of Sarja tries to incapacitate the cannons on their route to the fort but fails, and Sarja gets captured. Kastura then with help of Naik frees the Sarja by diverting attention of the fort guards by her thrilling acrobatic stunt over a rope joining two bastions housing long range cannons and subsequently incapacitating the cannons. Sarja then helps the Shivaji forces to capture the fort.

It received the 35th National Award for the best Feature Film in Marathi, 1987.

Cast

Ravindra Mahajani as Shivaji
Ajinkya Deo as Sarja
Pooja as Kastura
Seema Deo as Gauri Dombarin, Kastura's mother
Nilu Phule as Rustam 
Kuldeep Pawar as  Mughal Sardar
Ramesh Deo as Bahirji Naik

Music 
The music was composed by  Hridaynath Mangeshkar, and the lyrics were penned by Namdeo Dhondo Mahanor.

Track list

References

External links
 

1987 films
Best Marathi Feature Film National Film Award winners
1980s Marathi-language films
Films scored by Hridaynath Mangeshkar